James Wong may refer to:

 James Richard Wong Yin Song (born 1960), Anglican bishop of the Seychelles
 James Wong (ethnobotanist) (born 1981), British ethnobotanist, television presenter and garden designer
 James Wong Chye Fook (born 1952), former Malaysian footballer
 James Wong Kim Min (1922–2011), Malaysian politician
 James Wong (filmmaker) (born 1959), Cantonese-American television producer, writer, and film director
 Jimmy Wong (James Franklin Wong, born 1987), American actor, musician, and filmmaker
 James Wong Jim (1940–2004), Chinese lyricist
 James Wong Howe (1899–1976), cinematographer
 James C. L. Wong (1900–1970), bishop of the Episcopal Diocese of Taiwan

See also 
 James Wang (disambiguation)
 Jimmy Wang (disambiguation)